Soongava: Dance of the Orchids (translit. Soongava) is a 2012 Nepalese drama film written and directed by Subarna Thapa. It is Nepal's first lesbian film. The film was selected as the Nepalese entry for the Best Foreign Language Film at the 86th Academy Awards, but it was not nominated.

Cast
 Saugat Malla as Milan
 Deeya Maskey as Diya
 Nisha Adhikari as Kiran

Reception
Boyd van Hoeij writing for Variety, said the acting and technical aspects are passable, Hoeij further added "Unfortunately, the well-intentioned pic’s highly melodramatic (if tonally very serious) plotting and focus on a conservative, family-oriented society won’t do much to convince local queer youths that it does get better". Clarence Tsui of The Hollywood Reporter wrote, "It's true that Soongava is not exactly an epic tragedy in terms of story and look".

See also
 List of submissions to the 86th Academy Awards for Best Foreign Language Film
 List of Nepalese submissions for the Academy Award for Best Foreign Language Film

References

External links
 

2012 films
2012 drama films
2012 LGBT-related films
Lesbian-related films
LGBT-related drama films
2010s Nepali-language films
Nepalese drama films
Nepalese LGBT-related films
Cultural depictions of Nepalese women